The discography of Pennywise, an American punk rock band formed in 1988 in Hermosa Beach, California, currently consists of twelve studio albums, one live album, two extended plays (EPs), one compilation, one DVD and fourteen singles. This list is not intended to include material performed by members or former members of Pennywise that was recorded with CON/800, One Hit Wonder and Chaos Delivery Machine.

Studio albums

EPs

Compilation / live albums

Video releases

Singles

Music videos
 "Homesick" and "Dying to Know" (both released in 1993 and from "Unknown Road").
 "Same Old Story" (released in 1995; from "About Time").
 "Society" and "Bro Hymn Tribute" (both released in 1997 and from "Full Circle")
 "Alien" and "Straight Ahead" (both released in 1999; from "Straight Ahead").
 "Fuck Authority" and "My God" (both released in 2001 and from "Land of the Free")
 "Knocked Down" (released in 2006; from "The Fuse")
 "The Western World" (released in 2008; from "Reason to Believe")
 "Let Us Hear Your Voice" and "Revolution" (released in 2012; from "All or Nothing")
 "Violence Never Ending" (released in 2014; from "Yesterdays")

Video games
 Top Skater (1997; the soundtrack consists of ten songs from earlier Pennywise albums and one new Pennywise track)

References

Punk rock group discographies
Discographies of American artists